Camnula is a genus of band-winged grasshopper in the family Acrididae. It contains one species, Camnula pellucida, the clearwinged grasshopper. This grasshopper is found in most of North America excluding some southeastern states. It can be a severe pest in grains and rangelands.

References

Further reading

External links

 

Oedipodinae
Articles created by Qbugbot

Monotypic Orthoptera genera